Kadamaiyai Sei is a 2022 Indian Tamil-language psychological action comedy drama film written and directed by Venkat Ragavan in his second directorial film after Muthina Kathirika (2016). The film stars S. J. Suryah and Yashika Aannand in the lead roles with Charles Vinoth as the main antagonist, and other actors like Rajendran and Vincent Asokan in pivotal roles. The film released theatrically on 12 August 2022.

Plot
Dharmaraja is a renowned builder and Raj is his brother. As both are not on good terms Raj plans to hinder Dharmaraja's works by doing some mess-ups in the construction and the building is in a state of danger. Meanwhile, Ashok Mauryan, who has studied engineering, works as a security guard in the same apartment. Ashok finds out about the issues and warns Dharmaraja but gets caught in an accident and goes into a coma. How things get resolved is the rest of the movie.

Cast

Production 
On 9 September 2021, the first look poster of the film was released. The shooting of the film was wrapped on 21 July 2021.

Music
The music of the film is composed by Arun Raj.

Release

Theatrical 
The film released theatrically on 12 August 2022 along with Karthi's starrer Viruman. It was initially slated that the film would release on 13 May. But then there were some other reports suggesting that the film would release on 24 June. However the release date was postponed.

Marketing 
On 13 May 2022, the trailer of the film was released and received positive responses.

Reception
Logesh Balachandran of The Times of India gave the film's rating 2 out of 5 stars and wrote "The setup and playoffs are very poorly planned and doesn't rescue the film in anyway. We realise that the entire film is going to collapse just like the building with the only exception that we have no Ashok to save it." Dinamalar rated the film 2 out of 5. Chandini R of Cinema Express gave the film 2.5 out of 5 stars, stating that "If only, some better creative choices by the makers were in order, we would not just laud Kadamayai Sei but also enjoy it."

References

External links 
 

2020s Tamil-language films
Indian comedy films
2022 films